Nick Massi (born Nicholas E. Macioci, September 19, 1927 – December 24, 2000) was an American bass singer, songwriter, and bass guitarist for The Four Seasons.

Biography
Born in Newark, New Jersey, Nicholas "Massi" Macioci was first taught to play the bass fiddle by Newark native and musician Anthony Gaeta. As a bass singer, Massi had been playing with several bands before he joined The Four Lovers in 1958, including some groups that featured future Four Lovers and Four Seasons members Frankie Valli and Tommy DeVito. After the group evolved into the Four Seasons, they performed such hits as "Sherry," "Dawn (Go Away)," and "Rag Doll."  He was responsible for most of the group's vocal arrangements. Massi left the Four Seasons in September 1965, and was replaced temporarily by Charles Calello who, in turn, was replaced by Joe Long.

Massi, Tommy DeVito, Frankie Valli, and Bob Gaudio—the original members of The Four Seasons—were inducted into the Rock and Roll Hall of Fame in 1990 and the Vocal Group Hall of Fame in 1999.

Massi died of cancer on December 24, 2000, at his home in West Orange, New Jersey.

References

External links

Nickmassiart.com

1927 births
2000 deaths
Musicians from Newark, New Jersey
The Four Seasons (band) members
People from West Orange, New Jersey
American rock bass guitarists
American male bass guitarists
Jersey Shore musicians
Deaths from cancer in New Jersey
20th-century American singers
20th-century American bass guitarists
Guitarists from New Jersey
American basses
20th-century American male singers
American people of Italian descent